DXIX (102.3 FM) is a relay station of DXIC RMN Iligan owned and operated by Radio Mindanao Network. Its satellite office and FM transmitter are located at the 4/F Pafs Mejia Bldg., Roxas Ave. cor. Aguinaldo St., Iligan.

History
The station was established in 1978 under the call letters DXYX, airing a CHR/Top 40 format. On August 16, 1992, the station was relaunched as Smile Radio 102.3 and switched to a mass-based format. On November 23, 1999, it was rebranded as 1023 YXFM and switched back to its CHR/Top 40 format, with the slogan "Live It Up". On May 16, 2002, the station was relaunched once more 102.3 iFM (with a call letters DXIX) and brought back its mass-based format. In 2019, iFM added news and talk to its format, christening DXIX-FM and DXIC-AM respectively swapped sister stations. The station is now downgraded to a relay station of DXIC 711 AM.

References

Radio stations established in 1978
Radio stations in Iligan